The Palaeoctopodidae are a family of stem-group octopods known from the late Cretaceous.

References

Octopuses
Prehistoric cephalopods
Cretaceous cephalopods
Late Cretaceous first appearances
Late Cretaceous extinctions